Richard Wingfield, 3rd Viscount Powerscourt (24 December 1730 – 8 August 1788) was an Anglo-Irish politician and peer.

Biography 
Powerscourt was a younger son of Richard Wingfield, 1st Viscount Powerscourt and Dorothy Beresford Rowley. He was educated at Trinity College, Dublin and was admitted to the Middle Temple in 1746. He served in the Irish House of Commons as the Member of Parliament for Wicklow County from 1761 to 1764. That year he succeeded his brother, Edward Wingfield, 2nd Viscount Powerscourt, in his titles and assumed his seat in the Irish House of Lords.

He lived in Powerscourt House, Dublin. 

He married Lady Amelia Stratford, daughter of John Stratford, 1st Earl of Aldborough and Martha O'Neale, on 7 September 1760. Powerscourt was succeeded by his eldest son, Richard.

References

1730 births
1788 deaths
Alumni of Trinity College Dublin
Alumni of St John's College, Cambridge
18th-century Anglo-Irish people
Irish MPs 1761–1768
Members of the Irish House of Lords
Viscounts in the Peerage of Ireland
Members of the Middle Temple
Members of the Parliament of Ireland (pre-1801) for County Wicklow constituencies